Bongani Masuku was a South African vocalist best known as the backing vocalist of Johnny Clegg's band. In addition he also toured with I Muvrini on three European tours.

He was shot dead during an altercation with thieves on May 17, 2014, aged 50.

References 

21st-century South African male singers
2014 deaths
Year of birth missing